Urodacus hoplurus is a species of scorpion in the Urodacidae family. It is endemic to Australia, and was first described in 1898 by British zoologist Reginald Innes Pocock.

Distribution and habitat
The species can be found in much of the western part of the continent, including the Northern Territory, South Australia and Western Australia.

References

 

 
hoplurus
Scorpions of Australia
Endemic fauna of Australia
Fauna of the Northern Territory
Fauna of South Australia
Fauna of Western Australia
Animals described in 1898
Taxa named by R. I. Pocock